Dragon Force may refer to:

 Dragon Force, a 1996 role-playing video game from Sega created for the Sega Saturn.
 DragonForce, a British power metal band from London, England.
 Dragon Force (film), a 1982 martial arts film.
 , a 2012 Chinese action animation series, later animated film.
 Dragon Force: So Long, Ultraman, a 2017 Chinese action animated film.
 Dragon Force 2: Power of Ultraman, a 2018 Chinese action animation series.
 , a 2019 Chinese action animated film.